The 1981 Pan American Men's Handball Championship was the second edition of the tournament, held in Buenos Aires, Argentina from 9 to 14 November 1981. It acted as the American qualifying tournament for the 1982 World Championship.

Preliminary round

Group A

Group B

Knockout stage

Bracket

Fifth place bracket

5–7th place semifinal

Semifinals

Fifth place game

Third place game

Final

Final ranking

External links
Results on todor66.com

Pan American Men's Handball Championship
1981 in handball
1981 in Argentine sport
International handball competitions hosted by Argentina
November 1981 sports events in South America
Sports competitions in Buenos Aires